Da Sky's Da Limit is the third studio album by American rapper Big Pokey, from Houston, Texas. It was released on August 6, 2002, via Wreckshop Records. The album peaked at #47 on the US Billboard Top R&B/Hip-Hop Albums chart.

Track listing

Chart positions

References

External links

2002 albums
Big Pokey albums